Alfons Olszewski (5 April 1916 – 12 July 2006) was a Polish sailor. He competed in the mixed 6 metres in the 1936 Summer Olympics.

During the Second World War, Olszewski was imprisoned by German forces in Stutthof concentration camp. After the war, he joined a yacht club in Gdynia.

References

1916 births
2006 deaths
Polish male sailors (sport)
Olympic sailors of Poland
Sailors at the 1936 Summer Olympics – 6 Metre
Sportspeople from Gdańsk
People from West Prussia
Stutthof concentration camp survivors